Naimabad (also Romanized as Na‘īmābād) is a village in Fahraj Rural District, in the Central District of Fahraj County, Kerman Province, Iran. At the 2006 census, its population was 721, in 147 families. Mohammadghasem khan nicknamed Rafaatnezam was one of the residents of this village.Naeemabad
led by Rafaatnezam and Dahreza village led by Mohammadhassan Khan alias Khajehnezam were among the pioneers of the constitutional revolution in the south of Kerman.

References 

Populated places in Fahraj County